The Rosas-Julumito Fault is an oblique dextral strike-slip fault in the department of Cauca in southwestern Colombia. The fault is associated with the 1983 Popayán earthquake that partially destroyed Popayán, the capital of Cauca, and led to more than 300 fatalities. A maximum moment magnitude earthquake of 6.8 is estimated for the fault.

Etymology 
The fault is named after Rosas, Cauca and vereda Julumito of Popayán.

Description 

The Rosas-Julumito Fault is part of the Romeral Fault System. It is a rather short section of about  length,  of which have active tectonic movement. The fault section parallels the Cauca-Almaguer Fault, which is one of the largest older fracture zones in western Colombia. The fault crosses the Pliocene to Pleistocene Popayán Formation, which consists of pyroclastic flow, mud flow and ash-fall deposits.

The fault section runs through the smooth but hilly topography that is formed by sediments of the Popayán Formation. The fault morphology is easily observed on aerial photographs and satellite images and from aircraft. The most noticeable features are fault saddles, ponded Quaternary alluvial valleys, stream deflections, offset drainages, linear fault ridges, and shutter ridges. Beyond the Popayán Formation, where the fault is in older rock formations, the topographic expression of the fault is still noticeable.

Activity 

The fault is associated with the devastating 1983 Popayán earthquake (Mw 5.5) that caused more than 300 fatalities. Individual cracks were a few meters to tens of meters long and few millimeters in width. A maximum moment magnitude of 6.8 is assumed for this fault using only  for its probable total surface rupture length.

See also 

 List of earthquakes in Colombia
 Buesaco-Aranda Fault

References

Bibliography

Maps

Further reading 
 

Seismic faults of Colombia
Strike-slip faults
Thrust faults
Active faults
Faults
Earthquakes in Colombia